Corrado Ursi (26 July 1908 – 29 August 2003) was an Italian prelate of the Roman Catholic Church. He served as Archbishop of Naples from 1966 to 1987, and was created a cardinal in 1967, given the titular church of San Callisto.

Biography
Corrado Ursi was born in Andria, the son of a baker. He was baptized the day after his birth at the parish of San Agostino. After attending the seminary of Andria, he studied philosophy and theology at the Pontifical Regional Seminary of Molfetta. He was ordained a priest for the Diocese of Molfetta on 25 July 1931.

Shortly after his ordination, he became vice-rector of the Pontifical Regional Seminary of Molfetta. He was named rector a few months later, serving in that post until 1951. He did pastoral work in several Italian dioceses during the summer recesses, and became active in Azione Cattolica. He was named a privy chamberlain of his holiness on 15 July 1943.

In 1951, Pope Pius XII appointed Corrado Ursi Bishop of Nardò, a post that he held for 10 years. In 1961, he was transferred to the Diocese of Acerenza by Pope John XXIII.  In 1966 Pope Paul VI appointed him archbishop of Naples.

Ursi died on 29 August 2003. At the time of his death he was one of the last two surviving cardinals elevated by Pope Paul VI in the 1967 consistory, along with Pope John Paul II, leaving Pope John Paul II the lone surviving member of that consistory.

References

External links
"Ricordiamo il Cardinale Corrado Ursi". 

1908 births
2003 deaths
People from Andria
20th-century Italian Roman Catholic archbishops
Archbishops of Naples
20th-century Italian cardinals
Participants in the Second Vatican Council
Cardinals created by Pope Paul VI